Dobrodeia of Kiev (died 16 November 1131), was a Rus' princess, spouse of the Byzantine co-emperor Alexios Komnenos, and author on medicine.

Life
Born in Kyiv in the early years of the 12th century, Dobrodeia was the daughter of Mstislav I of Kiev and Christina Ingesdotter of Sweden. In or shortly after 1122, she married Alexios Komnenos, the eldest son and co-emperor of Byzantine emperor John II Komnenos. She received the title of empress (basilissa), and the name of Irene, after her mother-in-law, Empress Irene of Hungary. She and Alexios had one daughter, Maria, who was born .

In the imperial court of Constantinople, she became a part of a circle of women intellectuals, notably Alexios' aunt Anna Comnena, and the noblewoman Irene, known as a patron of astrologers and scholars. She was encouraged to find her own scholarly interest, studied extensively and was described by contemporaries: "She was not born in Athens, but she learned all the wisdom of the Greeks". The writer Theodore Balsamon noted that she "displayed a fascination with healing methods" and that she formulated medical salves and described their efficiency in a treatise on entitled "Ointments" (Greek "Alimma"), which is regarded as the first treatise on medicine written by a woman. Fragments of this work are kept in the Medici Library in Florence. She studied the ancient physician Galen, and translated some of his works into Old East Slavic. 

She died, of unknown causes, on 16 November 1131. Following her death, Alexios Komnenos is believed to have married his next spouse Kata of Georgia.

See also
Timeline of women in science

References

Sources
 
 

12th-century births
1131 deaths
Year of birth unknown
12th-century Rus' women
12th-century Byzantine writers
12th-century women writers
12th-century Byzantine empresses
12th-century Byzantine physicians
Byzantine women physicians
Rurik dynasty